Nichijin (日陣, May 30, 1339-June 14, 1419)  is considered a founder of the Hokkeshū Jinmon Ryū subsect of Nichiren Buddhism, although it was announced by Nichiin. He studied under Nichiryū (日龍) at Honjo-ji (本成寺) beginning at the age of 8, then left to study under Nichijō (日静) at 17.

While studying on Mount Chōkai he met a Tendai scholar, who he debated with. That scholar converted to Nichiren Buddhism in 1379 and changed his name to Nichijū. He also converted a Shingon priest who changed his name to Nichiin. He disappeared in 1419; it is believed he died on pilgrimage.

Japanese Buddhist clergy
Nichiren Buddhism
Nichiren Buddhist monks
1339 births
1419 deaths